Lea is a Czech drama film. It was released in 1997.

Plot
Lea witnesses her mother's rape and murder by her father as a child and because of it speaks very little and writes poems to her mother.  Lea then grows up with foster parents in a different part of Slovakia.  Strehlow buys Lea, now aged 21, from her foster father and imprisons her in a castle in Germany, using the same tools Lea's father used to control Lea as a child and to kill Lea's mother.  As Strehlow learns more of Lea's past, he permits her to continue writing to her mother.  Lea dies of a stroke within a year of living with Strehlow.

Cast
 Lenka Vlasakova.... as Lea
 Christian Redl.... as Strehlow
 Hanna Schygulla.... as Wanda
 Miroslav Donutil.... as Gregor Palty
 Udo Kier.... as Block
 Gerd Lohmeyer.... as Postmaster
 Tereza Vetrovska.... as Young Lea

Awards
 1997 Angers European First Film Festival
 Won Audience Award for Feature Film (tied with Some Mother's Son)
 Won C.I.C.A.E award
 Won Telcipro award (tied with Pretty Village, Pretty Flame)

1997 Brussels International Film Festival
 Won Audience Award
 Won Crystal Star Award for Best European Feature

Cinequest San Jose Film Festival
 Won Best Feature Award
 Nominated for Maverick Spirit Award

1998 Czech Lions
 Won Best Actress Award going to Lenka Vlasáková
 Won Best Cinematography going to Vladimír Smutný
 Nominated for Best Design Achievement going to Petr Kunc and Ludvík Široký
 Nominated for Best Director going to Ivan Fila
 Nominated for Best Editing going to Ivana Davidová
 Nominated for Best Film
 Nominated for Best Screenplay going to Ivan Fila
 Nominated for Best Sound going to Marcel Spisak and Max Rammier-Rogall

1996 European Film Awards
 Nominated European Film Award for Best Young Film

1997 German Film Awards
 Nominated Gold Film Award for Outstanding Feature Film

1998 USA Golden Globe
 Nominated Golden Globe for Best Foreign Language Film

1997 London Film Festival
 Won Satyajit Ray Award

1997 Max Ophüls Festival
 Won Audience Award

1997 Sochi International Film Festival
 Won FIPRESCI Prize

1997 Stockholm Film Festival
 Nominated Bronze Horse Award

1997 Venice Film Festival
 Won OCIC Award in Honorable Mention

External links
 

Czech drama films
1990s Czech-language films
1997 films
Czech Lion Awards winners (films)